Julio César and Júlio César are the terms for Julius Caesar in Spanish and Portuguese languages respectively. They may also refer to:
 Julio César Salas Municipality, Venezuela

Academics 
 Julio Cesar Firrufino (1578–1651), Spanish engineer and mathematician.
 Júlio César de Mello e Souza (1895–1974), Brazilian writer and mathematics professor
 Julio César Gutiérrez Vega, Mexican physicist
 Julio César Jobet (1912–1980), Chilean historian

Entertainment 
 Julio Cesar Cedillo, Mexican-American actor

Music 
 Julio César Meza (born 1983), Colombian singer
 Julio César Brero (1908–1973), Argentine composer

Politics 
 Julio César Arana (1864–1952), Peruvian politician
 Julio César Franco (born 1951), Paraguayan politician
 Julio César Godoy Toscano (born 1965), Mexican politician
 Julio César Grauert (1902–1933), Uruguayan political figure
 Julio César Méndez Montenegro (1915–1996), Guatemalan politician
 Julio César Pereyra (born 1951), Mayor of Florencio Varela, Buenos Aires, Argentina
 Julio César Strassera (1933–2015), Argentine prosecutor during the 1985 Trial of the Juntas
 Julio César Turbay Ayala (1916–2005), President of Colombia from 1978 to 1982
 Julio César Gámez Interiano (born 1955), Honduran politician

Sport

Association football

Players
Júlio César (footballer, born 1956) (Júlio César da Silva Gurjol), Brazilian international striker
Júlio César (footballer, born 1963) (Júlio César da Silva), Brazilian international defender
Júlio César (footballer, born November 1978) (Júlio César Santos Correa), Brazilian defender
Júlio César (football goalkeeper, born 1979) (Júlio César Soares de Espíndola), Brazilian international goalkeeper
Júlio César (footballer, born 1982) (Júlio César Coelho de Moraes Júnior), Brazilian defender
Júlio César (footballer, born January 1983) (Júlio César Mendes Moreira), Brazilian midfielder
Júlio César (footballer, born December 1983) (Júlio César de Oliveira Martins), Brazilian midfielder
Júlio César (footballer, born 1984) (Júlio César de Souza Santos), Brazilian goalkeeper
Júlio César (footballer, born 1986) (Júlio César Jacobi), Brazilian goalkeeper
Júlio César (footballer, born March 1995) (Júlio César de Freitas Filho), Brazilian defender
Julio César de Andrade Moura (born 1965), Brazilian born Peruvian international, commonly known as Julinho
Júlio César António de Souza (born 1976), Brazilian forward
Julio César Arzú (born 1954), Honduran goalkeeper
Julio César Baldivieso (born 1971), Bolivian international midfielder
Júlio César Basilio da Silva (born 1996), Brazilian defender
Julio César Benítez (1940–1968), Uruguayan defender
Julio César Britos (1926–1998), Uruguayan forward
Julio César Cáceres (born 1979), Paraguayan international defender for Club Olimpia
Júlio César da Cruz Coimbra (born 1980), Brazilian defender
Julio César Enciso (footballer, born 1974), Paraguayan international midfielder
Julio César Enciso (footballer, born 2004), Paraguayan midfielder
Julio César Gaona (born 1973), Argentinian goalkeeper for Crucero del Norte
Julio César Hurtado (born 1983), Bolivian midfielder for Club Blooming
Julio César Laffatigue (born 1980), Argentine forward for Querétaro F.C.
Julio César de León (born 1979), Honduran footballer for Platense
Julio César Manzur (born 1981), Paraguayan defender for Club Olimpia
Júlio César Martins (born 1978), Brazilian goalkeeper for Red Bull Brasil
Julio Cesar Moreira Ribeiro (born 1995), Brazilian forward
Júlio César do Nascimento (born 1979), Brazilian midfielder for Al Shabab Al Arabi Club
Júlio César de Paula Muniz Júnior (born 1988), Brazilian midfielder for Americana
Julio César Pinheiro (born 1976), Mexican defender for Japanese club Kyoto Sanga F.C.
Julio César Ramírez (born 1974), Uruguayan, last with Progreso
Júlio César Rocha Costa (born 1980), Brazilian defender
Julio César Romero (born 1960), Paraguayan midfielder, commonly known as Romerito
Julio Cesar Serrano (born 1981), Argentine midfielder for ŠK Slovan Bratislava
Júlio César da Silva Gurjol (born 1956), Brazilian forward, known as Júlio César Uri Geller
Júlio César da Silva e Souza (born 1980), Brazilian left winger for Gaziantepspor
Julio César Suazo (born 1978), Honduran defender
Júlio César Teixeira (born 1979), Brazilian fullback, better known as Julinho
Julio César Tobar (born 1978), Colombian defender for Millonarios
Julio César Valdivia (born 1982), Mexican goalkeeper for Cruz Azul
Julio César Yegros (born 1971), Paraguayan striker
Júlio César Zabotto (born 1983), Brazilian midfielder for Americana
Julio Furch (born 1989), German-Argentine forward for Club Olimpo
Julio Maya (born 1985), Cuban forward for River Plate Puerto Rico

Managers
 Julio César Cortés (born 1941), former Uruguayan international midfielder and manager
 Julio César Falcioni (born 1956), Argentine football manager and former goalkeeper
 Júlio César Leal (born 1951), Brazilian manager
 Julio César Moreno (born 1969), Chilean manager
 Julio César Ribas (born 1957), Uruguayan manager
 Julio César Toresani (1967-2019), Argentine manager and former midfielder
 Julio César Uribe (born 1958), Peruvian manager and former midfielder

Boxing
 Julio César Borboa (born 1969), Mexican super flyweight 
 Julio César Chávez (born 1962), Mexican multi-weight
 Julio César Chávez Jr. (born 1986), Mexican multi-weight 
 Julio César García (born 1987), Mexican middleweight
 Julio César Green (born 1967), Dominican middleweight
 Julio César González (born 1976), Mexican light-heavyweight
 Julio César Miranda (born 1980), Mexican flyweight
 Julio César Vásquez (born 1966), Argentine middleweight

Cycling
 Julio César Aguirre (born 1969), Colombian road racer 
 Julio César Blanco (born 1976), Venezuelan road racer
 Julio César Herrera (born 1977), Cuban track racer
 Julio César Rangel (born 1968), Colombian road racer

Other sports
Julio Cesar (mixed martial artist) (born 1994), Brazilian featherweight
Julio César Urías (born 1972), Guatemalan race walker
Julio Cesar Giraldo (Born 1995), Colombian Professional Rugby Player

See also
 Cesar (disambiguation)
 Julius Caesar (disambiguation)

Spanish masculine given names
Portuguese masculine given names